Wakefield A.F.C. is an association football club formed in 2019 currently playing in the Northern Counties East League Division One at Step 6 (Level 10) of the English football pyramid.

History
A group of businessmen founded the club in 2019.

In November 2021, VO2 Capital, a Connecticut-based family office took a majority interest at the football club.

On the same date, VO2 Capital also announced the merge with Wakefield Trinity Ladies Football club, thus creating a new women's section for Wakefield AFC.

In January 2022, Chairman Guilherme Decca appointed Gabriel Mozzini as first team manager as part of several measures taken by VO2 Capital to re-organize the club. Under Mozzini guidance the team went on a remarkable run of 17 unbeaten games including 6 consecutive clean sheets to finish the season. On May 14 Wakefield AFC finally won their first league title after beating Dodworth Miners at home in the last game of the season.

On May 12, 2022, Wakefield AFC was promoted to Northern Counties East League Division One for 2022-23 season.

Stadium 
The club play their games at the Millennium Stadium, Post Office Road, home of rugby league team Featherstone Rovers.  The club previously played in Barnsley but wanted to move to a stadium within the WF postcode area.

First-team squad

Technical Staff

References

Football clubs in England